Ho Iat Seng  (born 12 June 1957) is a Macau politician serving as the third and current chief executive of Macau since December 2019.

Early life 
In 1992, he studied electronic engineering and economics at Zhejiang University in Zhejiang; he would later become a visiting fellow of the university.

Political career 

Ho served as a member of the Chinese People's Political Consultative Conference of Zhejiang Province from 1978 to 1998. In 2000, he was selected as the National People's Congress member representing Macau and became a member of the Standing Committee in 2001. From 2004 to 2009, he served as a member of the Executive Council of Macau. In 2009, he was elected as a member of the Legislative Assembly of Macau; from 2013 to 2019, he served as its vice-president and between 2014 and 2017 its president. On 18 April 2019, Ho announced his intention to run for election in August as Macau’s chief executive.

Ho was elected as chief executive on 25 August 2019, and was subsequently appointed by Li Keqiang, Premier of China. He was officially sworn-in as the third chief executive of Macau on 20 December, coinciding with the 20th anniversary of Macau's handover to China.

Election results

Legislative Assembly

Chief Executive

See also
 List of members of the Legislative Assembly of Macau

References

1957 births
Living people
Chief Executives of Macau
Macau people
Cantonese people
Members of the Legislative Assembly of Macau
Members of the Standing Committee of the 9th National People's Congress
Members of the Standing Committee of the 10th National People's Congress
Members of the Standing Committee of the 11th National People's Congress
Members of the Standing Committee of the 12th National People's Congress
Delegates to the National People's Congress from Macau
Zhejiang University alumni